Leopold Anton Wackarž Ocist. (1810–1901) was the 40th Abbot of Vyšší Brod Monastery (1857–1901) and the 37th Abbot general of the Cistercian Order (1891–1900).

1810 births
1901 deaths
Cistercian abbots general
Austrian Cistercians
People from Horní Planá
Austrian people of German Bohemian descent